School Psychology International is a bimonthly peer-reviewed academic journal that highlights the concerns of those who provide quality mental health, educational, therapeutic, and support services to schools and their communities throughout the world.  It offers peer-reviewed articles reflecting high quality academic research in the field as well as examples of proven best practice.  This journal is a member of the Committee on Publication Ethics (COPE).  The journal was established in 1979 and is currently published by SAGE Publications.

Abstracting and indexing 
School Psychology International is abstracted and indexed in:

According to the Journal Citation Reports, its 2014 impact factor is 1.447, ranking it 26th out of 55 journals in the category "Psychology, Educational".

Notable articles 
 The three most-cited (>20 times) articles in School Psychology International are:
 
 
 

 The three most-read articles in School Psychology International are:

References

External links
 
 International School Psychology Association

SAGE Publishing academic journals
English-language journals
Education journals
Developmental psychology journals
Bimonthly journals
Publications established in 1979